Anton Kreß (8 June 1899 – 3 January 1957) was a German international footballer.

References

1899 births
1957 deaths
Association football forwards
German footballers
Germany international footballers
1. FC Pforzheim players